Güldeniz Önal Paşaoğlu (born 25 March 1986) is a Turkish volleyball player. She is 183 cm and plays as outside hitter.

Personal info
She studied at Gazi University.

Career
Önal win the 2010–11 CEV Champions League with her team VakıfBank Güneş Sigorta Türk Telekom.

Önal won the gold medal at the 2013 Club World Championship playing with Vakıfbank Istanbul.

Awards

Clubs
 2010-11 CEV Champions League -  Champion, with VakıfBank Güneş Sigorta Türk Telekom
 2011 FIVB Women's Club World Championship -  Runner-Up, with VakıfBank Türk Telekom
 2011-12 Turkish Women's Volleyball League -  Runner-Up, with Vakıfbank Spor Kulübü
 2012-13 Turkish Cup -  Champion, with Vakıfbank Spor Kulübü
 2012–13 CEV Champions League -  Champion, with Vakıfbank Spor Kulübü
 2012-13 Turkish Women's Volleyball League -  Champion, with Vakıfbank Spor Kulübü
 2013 Club World Championship -  Champion, with Vakıfbank Istanbul
 2013-14 CEV Champions League -  Runner-Up, with Vakıfbank Istanbul
 2014-15 CEV Champions League - Third, with Vakıfbank Istanbul
 2016-17 Turkish Women's Volleyball League - ,Runner-Up with Galatasaray Spor Kulübü

National Team
2011 European Championship - 
 2012 FIVB World Grand Prix - 
 2013 Mediterranean Games - 
 2015 European Games -

See also
Turkish women in sports

References

External links
 Official website 
 Player profile at Volleybox.net
 FIVB profile
 Telekom Ankara official website profile
 
 

1986 births
Living people
Sportspeople from İzmir
Turkish women's volleyball players
Türk Telekom volleyballers
İller Bankası volleyballers
VakıfBank S.K. volleyballers
Galatasaray S.K. (women's volleyball) players
Eczacıbaşı volleyball players
Gazi University alumni
European Games gold medalists for Turkey
European Games medalists in volleyball
Volleyball players at the 2015 European Games
Mediterranean Games silver medalists for Turkey
Competitors at the 2013 Mediterranean Games
Turkey women's international volleyball players
Mediterranean Games medalists in volleyball
20th-century Turkish sportswomen
21st-century Turkish sportswomen